Ketevan Arbolishvili (born 5 August 2003) is a Georgian rhythmic gymnast. She represent her country at international competitions.

Career

Junior 
Ketevan debuted at the 2016 European Championships in Holon where she competed with rope and ball, ending 32nd and 25th respectively as well as 11th in teams.

In 2018 she was at the European Championships in Guadalajara, being 9th in the All-Around, 25th with hoop, 41st with ball, 27th with clubs and 14th with ribbon. In October she represented Georgia at the Youth Olympics in Buenos Aires ending 10th in the All-Around.

Senior 
Arbolishvili became a senior in 2019 taking part in two World Cups, Baku and Minsk, being 57th in the All-Around, 69th with hoop, 57th with ball, 49th with clubs and 15th with ribbon in Azerbaijan and 41st in the All-Around, 31st with hoop, 44th with ball, 41st with clubs and 46th with ribbon in Belarus. She was at the European Championships in Baku finishing 52nd in the All-Around, 29th with ball and clubs and 37th with ribbon. Ketevan was also selected for the World Championships, again in Baku, along Natela Bolataeva and Salome Pazhava, she was 51st with clubs, 52nd with ribbon and 9th in teams.

In 2021 she made her debut at the World Cup in Sofia ending 41st in the All-Around, 57th with hoop, 40th with ball, 38th with clubs and 24th with ribbon. Then she competed at the stage in Baku taking 43rd in the All-Around, 39th with hoop, 43rd with ball, 42nd with clubs and 45th with ribbon. In June she was in Varna for the European Championships being 31st in the All-Around, 31st with hoop, 33rd with ball, 33rd with clubs. Later in the year she was also selected for the Wold Championships in Kitakyushu, where she ended 34th in the All-Around and with hoop, 28th with ball, 39th with clubs and 25th with ribbon. In December she was selected one of the 13 selected gymnasts from 13 different countries to represent Georgia is the experimental Divine Grace cupwhere she finished 3rd in Ball and All-around 

2022 saw her competing at the World Cup in Baku being 18th in the All-Around, 30th with hoop, 23rd with ball, 11th with clubs and 12th with ribbon. In June she was in Tel Aviv to participate in the European Championships ending 22nd in the All-Around and 14th in teams. A the start of September she represented Georgia at the World Championships in Sofia along the senior group, she was 48th in the All-Around, 65th with hoop, 44th with ball, 54th with clubs and 36th with ribbon.

References 
16. https://www.euronews.com/2021/12/23/divine-grace-competition-will-help-us-to-become-closer-to-the-unique-nature-of-rhythmic-gy

2003 births
Living people
Rhythmic gymnasts from Georgia (country)
21st-century people from Georgia (country)
Gymnasts at the 2018 Summer Youth Olympics